Bulbul Ahmed (born Tabarruk Ahmed; 4 September 1941 – 15 July 2010) was a Bangladeshi actor and director. He won the Bangladesh National Film Award for Best Actor award three times for his roles in the films Shimana Periye (1977), Badhu Biday (1978) and Shesh Uttar (1980). Besides, he was the producer of the film Rajlakshmi Srikanta (1987) which won the Best Film award.

Early life and career
Ahmed's father, Khalil Ahmed, was a government employee and an amateur actor. Ahmed started his acting career through stage drama in 1965. He began acting in television roles in 1968. He first appeared in films in 1973 as a supporting actor in Iye Korey Biye. He directed a total of four films, Rajlakshmi Srikanta (1987), Akarshan, Gorom Hawa and Koto Je Apon. He also produced a film titled Jibon Niye Jua.

Filmography

Films

Serial dramas
 Ei Shob Din Ratri

Personal life and death
Ahmed was married to actress Daisy Ahmed. Together they had three children, Wasif Ahmed Shubho, Tahsin Farzana Tilottoma and Tazrin Farhana Oindrila.

Ahmed died on 15 July 2010 in Square Hospital in Dhaka. He was suffering from diabetes and cardiac diseases.

References

External links

1941 births
2010 deaths
People from Dhaka
Notre Dame College, Dhaka alumni
Bangladeshi male film actors
Bangladeshi male television actors
Bangladeshi film directors
Best Actor National Film Award (Bangladesh) winners